Corinne Paliard (born 24 October 1970) is a former ice dancer who represented France. With partner Didier Courtois, she is the 1986 World Junior bronze medalist and 1988 French national champion. They placed 10th at the 1988 European Championships and 14th at the 1988 Winter Olympics.

Competitive highlights 
(with Courtois)

References 

1970 births
Living people
French female ice dancers
Olympic figure skaters of France
Figure skaters at the 1988 Winter Olympics
20th-century French women